West Green is an area of north London, England, in the United Kingdom and part of the London Borough of Haringey. It is located 5.7 miles (9.22 km) north of Charing Cross.

The area is mainly residential and includes both Chestnuts and Downhills parks. Its area is roughly defined by Downhills Park in the North and Northeast, by Cornwall Road to the East, a line running between Cranleigh and Stanley Roads to the South, Harringay Road and Stanmore Road to the West and Northwest.

History
West Green developed as a small village in the Middle Ages with settlement first recorded in 1393.  By the start of the seventeenth century, the eight buildings that then stood in West Green formed the only hamlet in the central area of the manor of Tottenham. Although it had not grown by 1800, by 1840 it contained 18 houses. This made it bigger than Wood Green at that time. Development took off during the period after the 1860s, particularly after the arrival of the Tottenham & Hampstead Junction Railway in 1878. Nineteenth-century local author, Charlotte Riddell described the changes vividly in her 1874 book Above Suspicion:

By 1890 the urbanisation of the area was complete.

Education

Park View is a secondary school located in the area. The school is situated next to Downhills Park.

Transport and locale

Nearest places
Harringay
St Ann's
Seven Sisters
Tottenham
Turnpike Lane
Wood Green

Nearest tube station
Turnpike Lane tube station
Seven Sisters tube station

Nearest railway stations
 South Tottenham railway station
 Seven Sisters station
 Harringay Green Lanes station

Buses
London bus routes 41, 67, 230, 341, N41 and W4 serve West Green.

See also
West Green railway station
Palace Gates Line

References

External links
Friends of Downhills Park
Woodlands Park Residents' Group
West Green on Google Maps

Districts of the London Borough of Haringey
Areas of London
Places formerly in Middlesex